The 1986 German Formula Three Championship was a multi-event motor racing championship for single-seat open wheel formula racing cars held across Europe. The championship featured drivers competing in two-litre Formula Three racing cars which conformed to the technical regulations, or formula, for the championship. It commenced on 18 May at Zolder and ended at Nürburgring on 21 September after eleven rounds.

Volkswagen Motorsport (Bertram Schäfer Racing) driver Kris Nissen clinched the championship title. He won races at Zolder, Hockenheim and had a hat-trick at Nürburgring. Hanspeter Kaufmann lost 44 points to Nissen and finished as runner-up with a win in the penultimate round at Salzburgring. Víctor Rosso won at Norisring and Österreichring. Bernd Schneider, Alfonso de Vinuesa and Gregor Foitek were the other race winners.

Teams and drivers

Calendar

Results

Championship standings
Points are awarded as follows:

References

External links
 

German Formula Three Championship seasons
Formula Three season